Royal Decree 56 of 2002 is a law issued in Bahrain by King Hamad ibn Isa al-Khalifah that grants impunity to security officers and state officials from being prosecuted for human rights abuses prior to 2001.

See also
 Torture in Bahrain
 State Security Law of 1974
 Human rights in Bahrain

External links

 Full text of Royal Decree 56 of 2002
 Amnesty International: Concerned that new legislation allows impunity for human rights offences (28 Nov 2002)
 Redress Trust: Submission Of THE REDRESS TRUST To The House of Lords meeting On Bahrain [pdf 154KB] (Aug 2004)
 Redress Trust: Reparation for Torture: A Survey of Law and Practice in 30 Selected Countries (Bahrain Country Report) [pdf 74KB] (May 2003)
 Conclusions and recommendations of the UN Committee against Torture: Bahrain (21/06/2005)
 AFP: Rights group calls on Bahrain to deal with legacy of torture (30 Sep 2005)

Torture in Bahrain
Law of Bahrain
2002 in Bahrain
Decrees